Hezbollah has a Foreign Relations Unit and maintains relations with a number of foreign countries and entities. These are particularly Shia states, but also Sunni groups like those affiliated with the Palestinian cause; and the group is also suggested to have operations outside the Middle East in places such as Latin America and North Korea.

Hezbollah has especially close relations with Iran, with the Alawite leadership in Syria, specifically with President Hafez al-Assad (until his death in 2000) and his son and successor Bashar al-Assad, and has sent fighters in support of Assad in the Syrian Civil War. Hezbollah declared its support for the now-concluded Al-Aqsa Intifada.

There is little evidence of ongoing Hezbollah contact or cooperation with al-Qaeda. Hezbollah's leaders deny links to al-Qaeda, present or past. Al-Qaeda leaders, such as former al-Qaeda in Iraq leader Abu Musab al-Zarqawi, consider Shia, which most Hezbollah members are, to be apostates, as do Salafi-jihadis today. However, the 9/11 Commission Report found that several al-Qaeda operatives and top military commanders were sent to Hezbollah training camps in Lebanon in 1994.

Position of the UN
UN Security Council Resolution 1559, calls for "the disbanding and disarmament of all Lebanese and non-Lebanese militia", echoing the Taif Agreement that ended the Lebanese Civil War, but does not explicitly include Hezbollah although Kofi Annan has advanced this interpretation. The Lebanese Government and Hezbollah dispute the application of this resolution to Hezbollah, referring to it as a "resistance movement" and not a militia. Israel has lodged complaints about Hezbollah's actions with the UN.

The UN's Deputy Secretary-General, Mark Malloch Brown, contests characterisations of the Lebanese militia as a terrorist organisation in the mould of al-Qaeda.
While acknowledging that "Hezbollah employs terrorist tactics," he says that it is unhelpful to call it a terrorist organization; the United States and the international community, in his view, would do well to respect it as a legitimate political party. On the other end of the spectrum, there are some in the United Nations who deny that Hezbollah's military activities against civilians are terrorist in nature at all.

Iran

In a 20 July 2006 article, scholar Fred Halliday wrote that Sheikh Naim Qassem, deputy leader of Hezbollah under Sheikh Hassan Nasrallah, told him Hezbollah follows Iran's leadership as a matter of principle.

Syria 
In an interview on Al-Arabiya TV in Dubai, former Hezbollah Secretary-General Subhi al-Tufayli said Hezbollah definitely fosters its relations with the Syrians, but Hezbollah's real leadership is 'the rule of the jurists'. Though Hezbollah presence in Syria was limited before 2012, Damascus had been the most important facilitator of Iranian support to the group and became increasingly active as a provider of material and political assistance on its own in the 2000s.

Since 2012 Hezbollah is helping the Syrian government during the Syrian Civil War in the fight against the rebels, which Hezbollah has described as a Wahhabi-Zionist conspiracy to destroy its alliance with Syria against Israel.

Relationships to other Islamic movements

Hamas 
According to Israeli author Ehud Yaari, Hezbollah's presence and strategy in Lebanon is a model for Hamas in terms of military, political, and media operations. The two groups share common tactics and common goals. According to Israeli military analysts, Hezbollah has assisted Hamas in producing "[more] lethal bombs." After the start of the al-Aqsa Intifada in September 2000, Hezbollah's leader Nasrallah declared his organization's support for the intifada supported by the PLO, Hamas, Islamic Jihad, and other organizations. Hezbollah began also to broadcast "continuous" anti-Israeli propaganda into Palestinian homes on its al-Manar television station, a tactic that reportedly led to the Hezbollah station becoming widely watched in Palestinian homes.

In 2013, it was reported that Hezbollah had ordered Hamas to leave Lebanon, on account of Hamas' support for forces fighting against the Damascus regime of President Bashar Assad. Both Hamas and the Lebanese Islamic Jihad denied these reports.

Alleged relationship with al-Qaeda
There is no concrete evidence of Hezbollah contact or cooperation with al-Qaida. US and Israeli counter-terrorism officials claim that Hezbollah has (or had) links to Al Qaeda, although Hezbollah's leaders deny these allegations.  United States intelligence officials also speculate there has been contact between Hezbollah and low-level al-Qaeda figures who fled Afghanistan for Lebanon. Ali Mohamed testified that Hezbollah trained al-Qaeda operatives on how to use explosives. In addition, Hezbollah and Al-Qaeda cooperate through money laundering, smuggling, and document forgeries. Some American newspapers have suggested a broader alliance between Hezbollah, al-Qaeda, and the Iranian Revolutionary Guard.

Al-Qaeda leaders, such as former al-Qaeda in Iraq leader Abu Musab al-Zarqawi, consider Shia, which most Hezbollah members are, to be apostates, as do Salafi-jihadis today.

On the other hand, others point out that al-Qaeda's Sunni ideology is fundamentally incompatible with Hezbollah's relatively liberal brand of Shia Islam; in fact, some Wahhabi leaders and al-Qaeda members consider Hezbollah to be apostate.
There was a fatwa issued several years ago by Abdullah Ibn Jibreen, a former member of Saudi Arabia's Council of Senior Ulema, which describes Hezbollah as "rafidhi" – a derogatory term for Shiites used by some Sunni fanatics. Even during 2006 Israel-Lebanon conflict it was cited by some hardline Sunni Muslim clerics and others writing on Islamist website.

Al-Qaeda has demonstrated its distaste for Shi'as in suicide bombings and attacks on Shi'a civilian targets in Iraq. Hezbollah denies any ties to al-Qaeda and al-Qaeda leader Abu Musab al-Zarqawi has issued an audio recording in which he called Hezbollah an "enemy of Sunnis." Saint Petersburg Times, ABC News, and MSNBC report that there exists no evidence of a connection between Hezbollah and al-Qaeda. Nasrallah denies links to al-Qaeda, present or past, stating in a 2002 interview that the two groups work in different areas and face different enemies. Hezbollah's aim has been to confront, and ultimately destroy, Israel, while bin Laden has focused on Afghanistan, Bosnia, and the former Yugoslavia.

Nasrallah, Hezbollah leader also condemned the 9/11 attacks and the methods of Al-Qaeda and their former leader Osama Bin Laden in an interview where he stated "What do the people who worked in those two World Trade Center towers, along with thousands of employees, women and men, have to do with war that is taking place in the Middle East? ? ... Therefore we condemned this act—and any similar act we condemn. ... I said nothing about the Pentagon, meaning we remain silent. We neither favored nor opposed that act .... Well, of course, the method of Osama bin Laden, and the fashion of bin Laden, we do not endorse them. And many of the operations that they have carried out, we condemned them very clearly."

Michel Samaha, Lebanon's former minister of information, has said that Hezbollah has been an important ally of the government in the war against terrorist groups, and described the "American attempt to link Hezbollah to al-Qaeda" to be "astonishing".

As part of a surge of intersectarian support for Hezbollah during the 2006 Israel-Lebanon conflict, Ayman al-Zawahiri, al-Qaeda's deputy leader, called for Muslims to rise up in a holy war against Zionists and join the fighting in Lebanon.

Hezbollah is also fighting against the Al-Qaeda affiliated Al-Nusra Front, later became Tahrir al-Sham Syrian rebel group in the Syrian Civil War on the same side as Assad's pro-government forces.

al-Mahdi Army
Hezbollah claims that it forbids its fighters entry into Iraq for any reason, and that no Hezbollah units or individual fighters have entered Iraq to support any Iraqi faction fighting the United States. On 2 April 2004, Iraqi cleric and Mahdi Army founder Muqtada al-Sadr announced his intention to form chapters of Hezbollah and Hamas in Iraq, and Mahdi senior member Abu Mujtaba claimed they were choosing 1,500 fighters to go to Lebanon.

Palestinian Islamic Jihad Movement

There have been American claims that Hezbollah has engaged in joint operations with the Sunni Palestinian militant group Palestinian Islamic Jihad Movement. The Islamic Jihad Movement has sent "its gratitude to the brothers in Hezbollah, the Islamic resistance in South Lebanon. Particularly Hassan Nasrallah, for their stance and support, be it financial, military or moral support".

Other non-state allies
 Liwa Abu al-Fadhal al-Abbas
 Liwa al-Quds
Kata'ib Sayyid al-Shuhada
 Kata'ib Hezbollah
 Asa'ib Ahl al-Haq
 Harakat Hezbollah al-Nujaba
 Liwa Fatemiyoun
Liwq Zulfiqar
 Baqir Brigade
 Polisario Front (Alleged) (Denied by Hezbollah)

Europe

European Union
In July 2013, the European Union designated the armed wing of Hezbollah as a terrorist organization. The foreign ministers of all 28 EU countries agreed to the decision which was based on concerns over Hezbollah's role in the 2012 Burgas bus bombing and the organizations involvement in Syrian civil war supporting the Ba'ath government.

A few of the EU member states have imposed partial or complete prohibitions on Hezbollah. The Netherlands proscribed the organisation fully, while the United Kingdom has proscribed Hezbollah's paramilitary External Security Organization, but not the organisation's political wing. On 25 February 2019 the UK parliament announced that it would introduce new rules to classify Hezbollah in its entirety as a terrorist organisation as "UK authorities say they are no longer able to distinguish between the group's military and political wings." A 2018 research  initiative found strong links between Hezbollah and illegal activity in Germany and this garnered a substantial response from the German public, asking to condemn Hezbollah's political wing as well. Germany banned Hezbollah entirely 30 April 2020.

Switzerland
Citing Swiss neutrality, Switzerland does not regard Hezbollah as a terrorist organization. Its government only uses the Sanctions List provided by the United Nations.

Attitude of Israel to Hezbollah
Dan Gillerman, the Israeli representative at UN, referred to Hezbollah as a "cancerous growth" that must be removed.

The Israeli Government considers the use of military force in Lebanon as a legitimate means of isolating Hizb'Allah.

Betar, a revisionist Zionist youth movement, uses the Holocaust and Nazis as a cognitive filter to describe Hezbollah.

Relationship with other countries and organizations

Hezbollah has been accused of training Iraqi insurgents to attack U.S. troops during the Iraq War. Besides Iran and Syria, Hezbollah also has ties with Venezuela and "has demonstrated a keen interest in extending its activities to other parts of Latin America." Hezbollah has also been known to recruit and train eastern Europeans, most notably in Russia, Bosnia, and Slovakia.

North Korea is also known to have ties to Hezbollah.

The British government has claimed that the Provisional Irish Republican Army had relations with Hezbollah and that the IRA provided the group with technology that was used against British forces in Iraq.

Morocco cut ties with Iran for supporting and giving aid to the Polisario Front through Hezbollah, via the Iranian embassy in Algeria.

Brazil considered designating Hezbollah as a terrorist organization, following Argentina and Paraguay as part of the Triple Frontier.

United States
The United States believes Hezbollah is an organization with ties to terrorism. The United States officially support the peaceful restructuring of Israel, and reconciliation with the Palestinian territories, (i.e. West Bank and the Gaza Strip). Due to their terrorist activities, neither Hezbollah or Hamas have been invited to be a part of any peace process led by the United States.

The Rewards for Justice Program has offered up to $10 million for information leading to disrupt the financial mechanisms of Hezbollah, including certain individuals: Adham Husayn Tabaja, Mohammad Ibrahim Bazzi, and Ali Youssef Charara. However, the Rewards for Justice Program also includes: Ali Atwa, Mohammed Ali Hammadi, Talal Hamiyah, Khalil Yusif Harb, Fuad Shukr and Haytham 'Ali Tabataba'i.

In December 2019, the United States Department of the Treasury sanctioned financiers like Nazem Said Ahmad, Saleh Assi and Tony Saab.

In May 2022, The US Treasury Department announced new Hezbollah-related penalties, naming Ahmad Jalal Reda Abdallah, a Lebanese businessman and the Iranian-backed group's financial facilitator, as well as his companies.

Arab League

On 11 March 2016, the Arab League designated Hezbollah a terrorist organization during a meeting of Arab League foreign ministers at the organization's headquarters in Egypt's capital Cairo. Nearly all 22 Arab League members supported the decision, except Lebanon, Syria, Algeria and Iraq which expressed "reservations" about the decision.

Designation as a terrorist organization

The following entities have listed the entire organization Hezbollah as a terror group: 

The following entities have listed only certain parts of Hezbollah as a terror group: 

The following countries do not consider Hezbollah a terrorist organization:

See also
 Ideology of Hezbollah
 Hezbollah political activities
 Hezbollah military activities

References

External links

 Syria, Iran, and the Mideast Conflict

F